Nataliya Leshchyk (Łacinka: Nataliya Leščyk; born 25 July 1995) is a Belarusian rhythmic gymnast who competed in group events. She is the 2012 Olympic all-around silver medalist with group members Anastasiya Ivankova, Alina Tumilovich, Maryna Hancharova, Aliaksandra Narkevich, and Kseniya Sankovich. At the 2012 European Championships, she won gold in 3 ribbons/2 hoops and silver in group all-around.

Detailed Olympic results

References

External links 

 
 
 

1995 births
Living people
Belarusian rhythmic gymnasts
Olympic gymnasts of Belarus
Olympic silver medalists for Belarus
Olympic medalists in gymnastics
Gymnasts at the 2012 Summer Olympics
Medalists at the 2012 Summer Olympics
Medalists at the Rhythmic Gymnastics European Championships